Denis Marandici (born 18 September 1996) is a Moldovan footballer who plays as a defender for Turan Tovuz.

Career 

Born in Moldova, Marandici grew up in Portugal.

On 4 February 2020, he signed a contract with Slovenian PrvaLiga club NK Celje.

Honours 
Celje
Slovenian PrvaLiga: 2019–20

References

External links 
 
 

1996 births
Living people
Footballers from Chișinău
Moldovan footballers
Association football fullbacks
U.D. Leiria players
NK Celje players
HŠK Zrinjski Mostar players
Campeonato de Portugal (league) players
Slovenian PrvaLiga players
Premier League of Bosnia and Herzegovina players
Azerbaijan Premier League players
Moldovan expatriate footballers
Moldovan expatriate sportspeople in Slovenia
Moldovan expatriates in Bosnia and Herzegovina
Moldovan expatriate sportspeople in Azerbaijan
Expatriate footballers in Slovenia
Expatriate footballers in Bosnia and Herzegovina
Expatriate footballers in Azerbaijan
Moldova youth international footballers
Moldova under-21 international footballers
Moldova international footballers
Portuguese people of Moldovan descent